Oskar Rozenberg Hallberg (born 11 November 1996) is a Swedish skateboarder from Malmö. He attended Bryggeriets Gymnasium, which had skateboarding in the curriculum. He competed for Sweden at the 2020 Summer Olympics in the park section, ending in 17th place.

References 

1996 births
Living people
Olympic skateboarders of Sweden
Swedish skateboarders
Skateboarders at the 2020 Summer Olympics
World Skateboarding Championship medalists
Sportspeople from Malmö
21st-century Swedish people